A Special Victims Unit (SVU) is a specialized division within some police departments. The detectives in this division typically investigate crimes involving sexual assault or victims of non-sexual crimes who require specialist handling such as the very young, the very elderly, or the disabled.

United States

New York City
The New York City Police Department's Special Victims Division  investigates sex crimes. It is housed in separate Borough Patrols (Manhattan, the Bronx, Queens, Staten Island and Brooklyn). The Special Victims Division only investigates the following types of cases:

 Any child under 11 years of age who is the victim of abuse by a parent or person legally responsible for the care of the child.
 Any child under 13 years of age who is the victim of any sex crime or attempted sex crime.
 Any victim of rape (all degrees) or attempted rape (all degrees).
 Any victim of a criminal sexual act (all degrees) or attempted criminal sexual act (all degrees).
 Victims of aggravated sexual abuse (all degrees).
 Victims of sexual abuse 1st degree.

They also deal with children, disabled and elderly victims of non-sexual crimes who require special handling. The Special Victims Division does not investigate murder or child pornography cases. Murders are investigated by the precinct detective squad in which the murder was committed and/or the borough homicide squad. Child pornography cases are investigated by various computer crime squads and task forces. Robberies are investigated by precinct detective squads and/or borough robbery squads. If a sex crime is involved, the Special Victims Division may assist in the investigation.

In popular culture
The American television show Law & Order: Special Victims Unit, the first spin-off in the Law & Order franchise, follows the cases of a fictional NYPD SVU division. Another U.S. television show Homicide: Life on the Street makes references to the Sex Crimes Unit, another name for Special Victims Unit.

See also 
 Rape
 Laws regarding rape
 Rape shield law (shields rape victims from scrutiny)
 Serial rapist
 Major case squad
 Cold case (criminology)
 Missing Persons Unit
New York City Police Department units